Benfica, Luanda is a commune of Angola located in Belas Municipality, the province of Luanda.

See also 

 Communes of Angola

References 

Populated places in Luanda Province